Bambata, or Bhambatha kaMancinza (c. 1865–1906?), also known as Mbata Bhambatha, was a Zulu chief of the amaZondi clan in the Colony of Natal and son of Mancinza. He is famous for his role in an armed rebellion in 1906 when the poll tax was raised from a tax per hut to per head (£1 tax on all native men older than 18 – infamously called ukhandampondo), increasing hardship during a severe economic depression. Bhambatha claims that he was told to lead an armed rebellion by the de facto Zulu King Dinizulu. Dinizulu disputed this account and no convincing evidence for either story is available.

Early years
It is unclear what year Bamatha was born due to no written records or birth certificates, but we estimate Bamatha was born in 1865, in Mpanza, near the town of Greytown, Natal Colony. He was the son of Chief Macinza, sometimes called Macinga, of the abakwa Zondi chieftaincy; and his mother, principle wife of Macinza, was the daughter of Chief Phakade, chief of an important Zulu chieftaincy, the Cunu. Bhambatha is also famous for being one of the 10,000 Zulu warriors to guard Shaka Zulus mother's grave for a year. He is said to have been a Zulu warrior under the strict Shaka Zulu Impi training and discipline.

The rebellion 

Bhambatha is famous for being one of the 10,000 Zulu warriors to guard Shaka Zulus mother's grave for a year, but he is better known for his role in an armed rebellion in 1906 when the poll tax was raised from a tax per hut to per head (£1 tax on all native men older than 18 - infamously called ukhandampondo) increasing hardship during a severe economic depression.

The Natal Police believed Bhambatha was going to resist the tax with force and sent about 150 men to arrest him. Instead the police were ambushed and four policemen killed. Thousands of colonial troops were then sent after him, including cavalry and heavy artillery, leading to 3,500 casualties. The British government claimed Bhambatha was killed in action in the Battle of Mome Gorge, while it is commonly believed among the Zulu people that he fled and eventually settled in Mozambique. He is often credited as an inspiration to South Africans during the anti-apartheid movement.

References

Zulu people
Year of birth uncertain
1860s births
1906 deaths